Aldaris may refer to:

 Aldaris, a character from StarCraft
 Aldaris Brewery, a brewery in Latvia